General of the Air (Spanish: General del Aire) also called Air General, is a four-star general officer and the second highest possible rank in the Spanish Air and Space Force. A General of the Air ranks immediately above a Lieutenant general and is equivalent to a General of the Army and an Admiral General. There is not equivalent in the Civil Guard or in the Spanish Navy Marines; in both cases the top rank is Lieutenant general.

The rank was created in 1999 to adapt the Spanish military rank to the ranks of NATO This is the highest rank that a military can reach, because the next higher is Captain General and that rank is only reserved to the King or Queen as commander-in-chief of the Armed Forces (even that sometimes has been given as honorary rank to some generals).

The General of the Air insignia consist in a baton crossed over a saber under a Royal Crown and a star in every angles that form the crossed baton and the saber. Being under a Crown means that the rank is part of the generalship (the group of generals of the Armed Forces), the baton and the saber means command and the four stars means the rank of General. This insignia was used before to 1999 by the Head of State as Captain General.

Promotion
The promotion to General of the Air is reserved to two positions. These are, the Chief of the Defence Staff and the Chief of Staff of the Air and Space Force.

Both positions are appointed by the Government, the first is directly nominated by the Prime Minister and the second is nominated by the Minister of Defence. Being appointed Chief of the Defence Staff means the automatically promotion to the rank of General of the Air. The same happens with the Chief of Staff of the Air and Space Force with the exception if the official appointed has the rank of Divisional general, in that case, the official needs to be promoted first to Lieutenant general.

Living Generals of the Air
As of January 2020, there are the 10 Generals of the Air alive, these are:

The most recent Air General to die was Santiago Valderas Cañestro on 12 January 2019, who served as Chief of the Defence Staff from 1996 to 2000.

References

{| style="border:1px solid #8888aa; background-color:#f7f8ff; padding:5px; font-size:95%; margin: 0px 12px 12px 0px;"
|- style="text-align:center;" 
! rowspan=2|  Spain(Edit)
| colspan=2| 
| colspan=2| 
| colspan=2| 
| colspan=2| 
| colspan=2| 
| colspan=2| 
| colspan=2| 
| colspan=2| 
| colspan=2| 
| colspan=3| 
| colspan=3| 
| colspan=2| 
| colspan=2| 
| colspan=2| 
| colspan=3| 
| colspan=3| 
|- style="text-align:center;" 
| colspan=2| Capitán General
| colspan=2| General del Aire
| colspan=2| Teniente General
| colspan=2| General de División
| colspan=2| General de Brigada
| colspan=2| Coronel
| colspan=2| Teniente Coronel
| colspan=2| Comandante
| colspan=2| Capitán
| colspan=3| Teniente
| colspan=3| Alférez
| colspan=6| Oficial Cadete
| colspan=6| Alumno
<noinclude>

Lists of Spanish military personnel
Spanish generals
Four-star officers
Spanish Air and Space Force